Live at WNUR 2-6-92 is a live album by The Flying Luttenbachers, released in 1992 through ugEXPLODE.

Track listing

Personnel 
Chad Organ – tenor saxophone
Hal Russell – tenor saxophone, soprano saxophone, trumpet
Weasel Walter – drums, clarinet

References

External links 
 

1992 live albums
The Flying Luttenbachers albums